Alexandre Boulerice  (born 1973) is a Canadian politician who has represented the riding of Rosemont—La Petite-Patrie in the House of Commons of Canada as a member of the New Democratic Party (NDP) since the 2011 election. He is currently the NDP's Quebec lieutenant and ethics critic. Boulerice was appointed as the Deputy Leader of the New Democratic Party on March 11, 2019, by party leader Jagmeet Singh. As of the 2019 federal election, Boulerice is the only NDP MP from Quebec and since the 2021 federal election, he is the only NDP MP from any province east of Ontario.

Early life and career
Alexandre Boulerice was born June 18, 1973, in Saint-Jean-sur-Richelieu. He started working at age 15 as a lifeguard for the municipality and then went on to become pool manager. After his cégep years, he studied sociology at the Université de Montréal, and then earned his master's degree in political science at McGill University.

Subsequently, he worked as a TV journalist (LCN, TVA), while being involved in his local union as vice-president of local 687 of the Canadian Union of Public Employees (CUPE). He has also worked for a community group, l'Union des travailleurs et travailleuses accidentés de Montréal (UTTAM). He then became a communications consultant for CUPE.

Federal politics

Alexandre Boulerice has been active in the New Democratic Party since the late 1990s. He first ran in the 2008 federal election and finished a distant third with 16.26 percent of the vote, well behind Bloc Québécois incumbent Bernard Bigras. He then became the vice president of communications for the Quebec section of the NDP, under the presidency of Françoise Boivin.

In the May 2, 2011, federal election, the NDP received 30.6 per cent of the votes, which translated into 103 seats in the House of Commons, of which more than half (fifty-nine) were from Quebec. This result allowed the NDP to form the Official Opposition in the House of Commons for the first time in history. This electoral breakthrough is now known as "la vague orange" (Orange Crush). One of those seats belonged to Boulerice, who won a decisive victory with 50.8 per cent of the vote, finishing 9,700 votes ahead of Bigras. The NDP had never finished higher than third in the riding or its predecessors before.

On May 26, 2011, Boulerice was appointed as opposition critic for the Treasury Board of Canada. In April 2012, he was appointed as Labour critic, and then as deputy Ethics and Access to Information critic.

After the 2015 election, in which the NDP fell back to third place in the federal seat count and the Liberal Party won a majority government, Boulerice was appointed the NDP's Quebec lieutenant, as well as its critic for Ethics and deputy critic for Democratic Reform in the 42nd Canadian Parliament. He also served as one of two New Democrats on the Special Committee on Electoral Reform.

Following the 2016 federal NDP convention's non-confidence vote in Tom Mulcair's leadership, various media outlets mentioned Alexandre Boulerice as a potential candidate, including The Globe and Mail, The Canadian Press, and columnists such as Lysiane Gagon. CBC TV quoted him a few days after the convention saying it was 'too early' to decide whether to run.

In early 2017, Boulerice was named Finance critic for the NDP.

He was re-elected in the 2019 and 2021 federal elections and was subsequently the only NDP MP returned from Quebec.

Bill C-307
In fall 2011, Boulerice tabled Bill C-307, a private member's bill "For the reassignment of pregnant and lactating women", to protect the rights of pregnant and lactating women who must leave their jobs to protect their health or the health of their child. This bill was intended to allow all workers to receive a reassignment under the provisions in force in their respective provinces. Quebec workers covered by the Labour Code of Quebec can receive benefits from the Workplace Health and Safety (OSH) in the program, "For safe motherhood." This bill was intended to allow workers covered by the Labour Code of Canada receive the same benefits and not be penalized during their pregnancy.

This bill was rejected with 169 votes against and 108 votes in favour in May 2012.

Canada Post
In December 2013, Canada Post's board of directors announced that it would be gradually putting an end to door-to-door mail delivery, leading to the elimination of 6,000 to 8,000 jobs. Boulerice was one of the first to oppose the cuts by promptly launching a petition to inform citizens of the consequences of such a decision. Bolstered by broad public mobilization and  mounting political reactions, he collaborated with the Canadian Union of Postal Workers to tour Quebec in order to explain the changes and to garner support against the decision. He ended his campaign by submitting a brief before the Commission sur le développement social et la diversité of the City of Montreal, which studied the impacts of ending door-to-door mail delivery on the installation of community mailboxes in densely populated areas, and on the quality of life of seniors and disabled people.

Vimy Ridge comments
On April 10, 2007, Boulerice wrote on a Quebec left-wing politics blog, Presse-Toi A Gauche, praising those who objected to and actively resisted Canada's participation in the First World War stating it was "a purely capitalist war on the backs of the workers and peasants". Boulerice further criticised the celebration of the Battle of Vimy Ridge, led by the Conservative government under then Prime Minister Stephen Harper, saying that "thousands of poor wretches were slaughtered to take possession of a hill."

Electoral record

References

External links
 

1973 births
Living people
Canadian democratic socialists
New Democratic Party MPs
Members of the House of Commons of Canada from Quebec
People from Saint-Jean-sur-Richelieu
McGill University alumni
Université de Montréal alumni
21st-century Canadian politicians
Politicians from Montreal
Canadian socialists